Fonde is an unincorporated community in Bell County, Kentucky.

References

Unincorporated communities in Bell County, Kentucky
Unincorporated communities in Kentucky